A heath is a shrubland habitat found mainly on free-draining infertile, acidic soils and characterised by open, low-growing woody vegetation. Moorland is generally related to high-ground heaths with—especially in Great Britain—a cooler and damper climate.

Heaths are widespread worldwide but are fast disappearing and considered a rare habitat in Europe. They form extensive and highly diverse communities across Australia in humid and sub-humid areas where fire regimes with recurring burning are required for the maintenance of the heathlands. Even more diverse though less widespread heath communities occur in Southern Africa. Extensive heath communities can also be found in the Texas chaparral, New Caledonia, central Chile, and along the shores of the Mediterranean Sea. In addition to these extensive heath areas, the vegetation type is also found in scattered locations across all continents, except Antarctica.

Characteristics 
Heathland is favoured where climatic conditions are typically hard and dry, particularly in summer, and soils acidic, of low fertility, and often sandy and very free-draining; a mire may occur where drainage is poor, but usually is only small in extent.

Heath vegetation can be extremely plant-species rich, and heathlands of Australia are home to some 3,700 endemic or typical species in addition to numerous less restricted species. The fynbos heathlands of South Africa are second only to tropical rainforests in plant biodiversity with over 7,000 species. In marked contrast, the tiny pockets of heathland in Europe are extremely depauperate with a flora consisting primarily of heather (Calluna vulgaris), heath (Erica species) and gorse (Ulex species).

The bird fauna of heathlands are usually cosmopolitan species of the region. In the depauperate heathlands of Europe, bird species tend to be more characteristic of the community, and include Montagu's harrier and the tree pipit. In Australia the heathland avian fauna is dominated by nectar-feeding birds such as honey-eaters and lorikeets, although numerous other birds from emus to eagles are also common in Australian heathlands. The birds of the South African fynbos include sunbirds, warblers and siskins. Heathlands are also an excellent habitat for insects including ants, moths, butterflies and wasps; many species are restricted entirely to it. One such example of an organism restricted to heathland is the silver-studded blue butterfly, Plebejus argus.

Anthropogenic heaths 
Anthropogenic heath habitats are a cultural landscape that can be found worldwide in locations as diverse as northern and western Europe, the Americas, Australia, New Zealand, Madagascar and New Guinea.

These heaths were originally made or expanded by centuries of human clearance of the natural forest and woodland vegetation, by grazing and burning. Referring to heathland in England, Oliver Rackham says, "Heaths are clearly the product of human activities and need to be managed as heathland; if neglected they turn into woodland".

In recent years, the conservation value of these man-made heaths has become much more appreciated, due to their historical cultural value as habitats; consequently, most heathlands are protected. However they are also threatened by tree incursion because of the discontinuation of traditional management techniques, such as grazing and burning, that mediated the landscapes. Some are also threatened by urban sprawl. Anthropogenic heathlands are maintained artificially by a combination of grazing and periodic burning (known as swailing), or (rarely) mowing; if not so maintained, they are rapidly recolonised by forest or woodland. The recolonising tree species will depend on what is available as the local seed source, and thus it may not reflect the natural vegetation before the heathland became established.

In literature 

The heath features prominently in:

 King Lear, by William Shakespeare
 Wuthering Heights, by Emily Brontë
 The Return of the Native, by Thomas Hardy
 Ethan Frome, by Edith Wharton

Gallery

See also 

 Bolster heath
 Chalk heath
 Garrigue
 Maquis shrubland
 Matorral
 Scrubland

References

External links 

 The Countryside Agency information on types of open land
 Origin of the word 'heath'

 
Habitats
Mediterranean forests, woodlands, and scrub
Temperate grasslands, savannas, and shrublands
Landforms
Land management
Cultural landscapes